Germanus I (c. 634 – 733 or 740) was the Patriarch of Constantinople from 715 to 730. He is regarded as a saint, by both the Orthodox and Roman Catholic Churches, with a feast day of 12 May.  He had been ecumenically preceded by Patriarch John VI of Constantinople, and was succeeded in Orthodox rite by patriarch Constantine II of Constantinople.

Life
According to Theophanes the Confessor, Germanus was a son of patrician Justinian, who was executed in 668. Justinian was reportedly involved in the murder of Constans II and usurpation of the throne by Mezezius. Constantine IV, son of Constans II, defeated his rival and punished the supporters of Mezezius. Germanus survived the persecutions, but was made a eunuch by the victors.

Germanus was sent to a monastery. He resurfaces as Bishop of Cyzicus. He took part in the 712 Council of Constantinople where decisions favored Monothelitism, abolishing the canons of the Third Council of Constantinople (680-681). The Council followed the religious preferences of Philippikos Bardanes.

In 713, Philippikos Bardanes was deposed by Anastasios II. Anastasios soon reversed all religious decisions of his predecessor. Patriarch John VI, strongly associated with Monothelitism, was eventually dismissed. On 11 August 714/715, Germanus was elected Patriarch of Constantinople. Germanus later helped negotiate Anastasius' surrender terms to Theodosios III.

In 715, Germanus organized a new council propagating Dyothelitism and anathematizing various leaders of the opposing faction. He attempted to improve relations with the Armenian Apostolic Church with a view towards reconciliation. The major issue of his term would, however, be the emerging Byzantine Iconoclasm, propagated by Leo III the Isaurian. Germanus was an iconodule, and played an important role in defending the use of sacred images during the iconoclastic crisis of his day, suffering exile for his opposition to the emperor, who considered reverence for these images a form of idolatry.

After an apparently successful attempt to enforce the baptism of all Jews and Montanists in the empire (722), Leo issued a series of edicts against the worship of images (726–729). A letter by the patriarch Germanus written before 726 to two Iconoclast bishops says that "now whole towns and multitudes of people are in considerable agitation over this matter" but we have very little evidence as to the growth of the debate.

Germanus either resigned or was deposed following the ban. Surviving letters Germanus wrote at the time say little of theology. According to Patricia Karlin-Hayter, what worried Germanus was that the ban of icons would prove that the Church had been in error for a long time and therefore play into the hands of Jews and Muslims. Tradition depicts Germanus as much more determined in his position, even winning a debate on the matter with Constantine, Bishop of Nacoleia, a leading Iconoclast. Pope Gregory II (term 715–731), a fellow iconodule, praised Germanus' "zeal and steadfastness".

Germanus was replaced by Anastasios, more willing to obey the emperor. Germanus retired to the residence of his family. He died a few years at an advanced age in 740.  He was buried at the Chora Church. The Second Council of Nicaea (787) included Germanus in the diptychs of the saints. He has since been regarded a saint by both the Eastern Orthodox Church and the Catholic Church.

Several of his writings have been preserved. His Historia Ecclesiastica was a popular work in Greek and Latin translations for many centuries, and remains often quoted by scholars. Parts of it were published in English in 1985 as On the Divine Liturgy, described by its publishers as "for centuries the quasi-official explanation of the Divine Liturgy for the Byzantine Christian world".  However the Johann Peter Kirsch is dubious that the work is actually by Germanus.

Influence
Pope Pius XII included one of his texts in the apostolic constitution proclaiming Mary's assumption into heaven a dogma of the Church.

Among his writings was the hymn "Μέγα καί παράδοξον θαῦμα" translated by John Mason Neale as "A Great and Mighty Wonder", although Neale misattributed this to Anatolius of Constantinople.

See also

References

Sources
 
Gross, Ernie. This Day in Religion. New York: Neil-Schuman Publishers, 1990. .
Mango, Cyril, "Historical Introduction," in Bryer & Herrin, eds., Iconoclasm, pp. 2–3., 1977, Centre for Byzantine Studies, University of Birmingham, 

 GERMANO DI COSTANTINOPOLI, Storia ecclesiastica e contemplazione mistica. Traduzione, introduzione e note a cura di Antonio Calisi, Independently published, 2020.

External links

On the Divine Liturgy, Online text (English and Greek)
Pope Benedict XVI. "On St. Germanus of Constantinople", General Audience, 29 April 2009 

740 deaths
8th-century patriarchs of Constantinople
8th-century Christian saints
Byzantine hymnographers
Byzantine eunuchs
Byzantine Iconoclasm
Year of birth unknown
Bishops of Cyzicus
Leo III the Isaurian
Year of birth uncertain
8th-century Byzantine writers